Cheil Worldwide Inc. is a marketing company under the Samsung Group that offers advertising, public relations, shopper marketing, sports marketing, digital marketing, etc. It was established in 1973 with headquarters in Seoul, South Korea.

It is the country's largest and the world's 19th largest advertising agency, by 2018 revenues, and the world's 14th creative agency network. Its major clients include Samsung, Absolut, Adidas, The Coca-Cola Company, GE, General Motors, The Lego Group, Microsoft, Nestle, and Shell. It has 53 offices spread across 5 continents and CIS.

History
In 1973 when the company was established by Lee Byung-chul, the Korean entrepreneur who founded Samsung Group, the official name was Cheil Communications. It began conducting Korea's first nationwide lifestyle surveys in 1977; set up a joint venture with Bozell in 1989; and set up Hakuhodo-Cheil in 1999. The company changed its name to Cheil Worldwide in 2008.

Cheil Worldwide opened its first international branch office in Tokyo in 1988 and established Cheil USA 4 years later. From the late 2000s, it began to acquire stakes in overseas agencies. It acquired a stake in London-based agency Beattie McGuinness Bungay in 2008 and New York-based digital shop, The Barbarian Group in 2009. In order to gain further foothold in the US and China, Cheil bought two more agencies in 2012, McKinney and Bravo Asia, respectively.

Most recently in January 2019, it opened a new office in Buenos Aires, Argentine, increasing the company's global footprint to a total 44 countries. As of May 2019, Cheil has 53 offices and 9 affiliates across 44 countries.

In November 2014, it announced that it had signed a deal to acquire a significant initial investment in the UK-based agency iris worldwide. The deal will potentially rise to 100% of the business over the next five years. In 2016, it acquired Founded, a creative agency with offices in London and San Francisco.

In December 2017, executive vice president Jeongkeun Yoo was appointed to president and CEO after the resignation of Daiki Lim.

In June 2020, Cheil Worldwide has announced the purchase of ColourData, a social media data analytics company based in China. The Agency Network stated that the acquisition helps strengthen its data-driven marketing skills.

Awards and recognition
Cheil's work for Tesco Homeplus won one Grand-prix and four Golds at the Cannes Lions International Festival of Creativity in 2011 and the Digital Campaign of the Year at the South by Southwest Interactive (SXSWI) in 2012. Even after a year the campaign was launched, industry publication AdAge hailed the Homeplus work as "the one with lasting impact you don't see with many other celebrated campaigns."

A wider range of Cheil's works was recognized in 2012. Award wins include 12 Cannes Lions including 3 Gold and 1 Grand Prix at the Spikes Asia in which Simon Hong, Cheil's Executive Creative Director, presented a seminar session on "Nothing Ever Becomes Real Till It Is Experienced". He discussed about the brand experience for consumers and how important is creativity and technology. Earlier in the same year, Cheil partnered with K-Pop group 2NE1 to host a seminar at the Cannes Lions. The session was about how digital technology has driven the "Korean Wave"; how K-pop is taking over the world through digital and social media; and what it means for advertising.

In 2013, The Barbarian Group, an American digital agency acquired by Cheil in 2009, won an Innovation Grand Prix at the Cannes Lions. Adding to the list of awards, the Bridge of Life won a Grand CLIO award for Public Relations and two Gold and a Titanium at the Cannes Lions. At the Cannes Lions 2013, Cheil UK took one Gold and two Bronze for We are David Bailey campaign; German office's Free the Forced scooped one Gold, one Silver and four Bronze. Later in 2013 at the Eurobest, Simon Hathaway and Daniele Fiandaca from Cheil talked about the emergence of shopper marketing and what the rest of world can learn about the field from South Korea.

Cheil once again spoke at the Cannes Lions seminar in June 2014, with a guest speaker from Samsung Electronics. The seminar addressed how the age of mobile has fundamentally changed the way we live our lives, and how it has changed companies which have to market their products and services to this fast-changing generation of mobile.

In 2015, Cheil won 10 Cannes Lions including one Gold, three Silver and one Bronze for the Look At Me campaign. Look at Me campaign also won 2 Grand Prix at the Spikes Asia. Peter Kim, Cheil's Chief Digital Officer, spoke to the audience at the Cannes Lions seminar, and provided ten insights into things that will change in social media over the next decade.

In 2016, Cheil Worldwide Spain took one Gold and one Bronze for Blind Cap campaign at Cannes Lions. Also, Cheil and guest speaker from KT drew attention to the enormous change that Internet of Things will bring to marketing - diversifying into completely individualized, independent brand experiences for each consumer.

In 2017, iris Worldwide won one Silver and four Bronze for adidas Glitch campaign at Cannes Lions. Cheil hosted two seminars partnering with CJ E&M. The first session, with South Korea's famous TV producer Yungsuk Nah and actor Seojin Lee, Cheil talked about the 'power of boredom’ that's widely taking place beyond TV shows to other different areas including advertising, film and gaming. The second session, with YG Entertainment USA, Cheil shared insights into the rise of KPOP and the KPOP lifestyle.

References

Further reading
 Korea's ad spend hits record high, Campaign Brief Asia, 2012-02-28
 Samsung Photo Exhibit Showcases Work by Blind Children, AdAge, 2012-04-05
 Cheil Worldwide hires SaatchiX CEO as shopper marketing expert, M & M Global, 2012-06-13
 Cannes Lions seminars debrief, Contagious, 2013-06-18
 Cheil South Korea's "Bridge of Life" is Asia's only Titanium Lion winner at Cannes Lions, Campaign Brief Asia, 2013-06-23
 Cannes Lions 2013: innovation in marketing - video debate, The Guardian, 2013-06-18
 Cheil wins creative mandate for CITIC Capital's Hefei retail property, Campaign Asia Pacific, 2013-10-03
 How Asian Agencies Become Global Holding Companies, AdAge, 2013-12-27
 DIGITAL: HOMEPLUS SMART VIRTUAL STORE Luerzer's Archive
 Shiv Sethuraman appointed as Cheil group President for South West Asia region, Economic Times of India, 2015-01-06
 Lotta Malm Hallqvist joins Cheil from McCann, Campaign, 2015-01-07
 Kiwi expat Malcolm Poynton moves into global chief creative officer role at Cheil Worldwide, Campaign Brief Asia, 2015-01-16
 Interview with Anis Zantout, Regional Digital Director-Cheil MENA, Media Avataar Me, 2015-01-27
 Mobile to the rescue in Korea's 2014-15 ad spending: Cheil, Digital Market Asia, 2015-02-24

External links
 

 
Advertising agencies of South Korea
Companies based in Seoul
Business services companies established in 1973
Companies listed on the Korea Exchange
Samsung subsidiaries
South Korean companies established in 1973
South Korean brands